Hobie Call (born 1977) is an American obstacle course racer.  Call is a multiple-time winner of the Spartan Race, an obstacle race with challenges similar to those found in the television program American Gladiators.

A native of Utah, he is the father of five children.

Call won the Scramble Gamble at the Superhero Scramble race in Miami, FL on March 12, 2012. He finished first with a time of 33:29 and won a cash purse of $2,000. Hobie also ran in and won the Scramble Gamble race in Waldo, FL on July 28, 2012, with a finishing time of 27:05. Since, Hobie has won many Superhero Scrambles.

Call took the first win of the Spartan Race season in Southern California.  He finished the 8 mile course in under an hour.

He was 2nd place male at the 2012 Spartan Race Championships at Killington, VT  and the first place male competitor at the 2013 Spartan Race Championship at Killington, VT.

Call also participated in Episode 44, 47, and 50 of the OCR Warrior TV Show.

Obstacle Racing Results

See also
 Spartan Race
 Tough Mudder
 Warrior Dash
 Battlefrog Series

References 

American sportsmen
Living people
1977 births
Obstacle racing